Forgotten Man is an album by jazz saxophonist Lou Donaldson, his first recording for the Timeless label, featuring Donaldson's quartet with Herman Foster, Geoff Fuller, and Victor Jones.

Reception
The album was awarded 2½ stars in an Allmusic review by Scott Yanow who stated "Although not essential, this album should easily please Lou Donaldson's fans, for it finds him in exuberant form".

Track listing
All compositions by Lou Donaldson except as indicated
 "Confirmation" (Charlie Parker) - 5:58  
 "Whiskey Drinkin' Woman" (Lou Donaldson, Leon Spencer) - 5:34  
 "This is Happiness" (Tadd Dameron) - 3:44  
 "Tracy" - 4:37  
 "Melancholy Baby" (Ernie Burnett, George Norton) - 6:52  
 "Don't Blame Me" (Dorothy Fields, Jimmy McHugh) - 5:15  
 "Exactly Like You" (Fields, McHugh) - 7:00  
Recorded in Milan, Italy on July 2, 1981.

Personnel
Lou Donaldson - alto saxophone, vocals
Herman Foster - piano
Geoff Fuller - bass
Victor Jones - drums

References

Lou Donaldson albums
1981 albums
Timeless Records albums